"The Cafe" is the 24th episode of Seinfeld. The episode was the seventh episode of the show's third season. It aired on November 6, 1991 on NBC.

Plot
Jerry becomes fascinated with a failing local eclectic restaurant called "The Dream Café" and befriends its Pakistani owner Babu Bhatt. Trying to turn the restaurant into a success, Jerry convinces Babu to change the decor and menu into a Pakistani restaurant. However, the restaurant does no better and he angrily blames Jerry for the failure.

George's girlfriend Monica asks him to take an IQ test for her education course. Worried about being embarrassed by the score, he asks Elaine to secretly take it for him. The plan backfires after Elaine takes the test at the Dream Café, where she is distracted by Jerry (who insists she order food to support Babu), Kramer (who keeps asking her questions about the test), and Babu (who spills food on the test paper). Due to the distractions, she ends up with a low score of 85.

George begrudgingly agrees to allow Elaine to retake the test, which she does alone at Jerry's apartment. But just as she's about to leave, Kramer arrives and locks himself in after being chased by his mother's ex-boyfriend for stealing his jacket, thereby trapping Elaine inside as well. By the time Elaine finally gets to Monica's house to give George the test, the test time is up and their plan is discovered.

The group notice that the Dream Café has been forced out of business and they wonder where to go for dinner. They each argue in favor of a different type of cuisine. When Jerry says "You know what would be great?" implying it would be great to have an eclectic restaurant nearby, the others give him a look of disdain.

References

External links 
 

Seinfeld (season 3) episodes
1991 American television episodes